Hector F. DeLuca, born in Pueblo, Colorado in 1930,  is an emeritus University of Wisconsin–Madison professor and former chairman of the university's biochemistry department. DeLuca is well known for his research in involving Vitamin D, from which several pharmaceutical drugs are derived. He was elected to the United States National Academy of Sciences in 1979.

DeLuca has trained almost 160 graduate students and has more than 150 patents to his name. Licensing of his technology, through the Wisconsin Alumni Research Foundation, has generated tens of millions of dollars in revenue for the university.

In addition, DeLuca is president of Deltanoid Pharmaceuticals, a biotechnology company founded on technology he developed.

He was awarded the Bolton S. Corson Medal of the Franklin Institute in 1985. Three buildings on the Wisconsin campus, including the DeLuca Biochemistry Building, were named in his honor in 2014.

References

American biochemists
University of Wisconsin–Madison faculty
Members of the United States National Academy of Sciences
Living people
Vitamin researchers
1930 births